The world record progression of the men's speed skating big combination as recognised by the International Skating Union:

References 

World Big combination Men